Celerino is both a surname and a given name. Notable people with the name include:

Gioele Celerino (born 1993), Italian rugby league player
Celerino Castillo III (born 1949), United States Drug Enforcement Administration agent
Celerino Sánchez (1944–1992), Mexican baseball player